Zhou Xiaowen (born 1954 in Beijing) is a Chinese filmmaker.  He graduated from the Cinematography Department of the Beijing Film Academy in 1975 and is part of the so-called Fifth Generation of Chinese filmmakers.

Zhou's thrillers received commercial success. Due to government censorship several of his films were prevented from being released. Very few people not in China knew about Zhou before the 1994 release of Ermo.

Selected filmography

References
 Xiao, Zhiwei and Yingjin Zhang. Encyclopedia of Chinese Film. Taylor & Francis, June 1, 2002. , 9780203195550.

Notes

External links

 
 
 Zhou Xiaowen at the Chinese Movie Database
 "Zhou Xiaowen on 'The Emperor's Shadow', by Augusta Palmer, from IndieWire People

Film directors from Beijing
Beijing Film Academy alumni
1954 births
Living people

20th-century Chinese male actors
Chinese male television actors